Sinovica is a small settlement in the hills northeast of Sodražica in southern Slovenia. The village is surrounded by fields and forests. Some of the buildings in the settlement are abandoned. The area is part of the traditional region of Lower Carniola and is now included in the Southeast Slovenia Statistical Region.

References

External links
Sinovica on Geopedia

Populated places in the Municipality of Sodražica